The 1923 Italian Grand Prix was a Grand Prix motor race held at Monza on 9 September 1923.

It was the first race to be designated as the European Grand Prix.

Classification

References

Italian Grand Prix
Grand Prix
Italian Grand Prix
European Grand Prix